Cahuilla , or Ivilyuat (Ɂívil̃uɂat or Ivil̃uɂat ), is an endangered Uto-Aztecan language, spoken by the various tribes of the Cahuilla Nation, living in the Coachella Valley, San Gorgonio Pass and San Jacinto Mountains region of southern California. The Cahuilla demonyms include Ɂívil̃uwenetem or Iviatam–speakers of Ivilyuat (Iviɂa)–or táxliswet meaning "person." A 1990 census revealed 35 speakers in an ethnic population of 800. With such a decline, Ivilyuat is classified as "critically endangered" by the UNESCO Atlas of the World's Languages in Danger as most speakers are middle-aged or older with limited transmission rates to children.

Three dialects are known to exist: Desert, Mountain and Pass, as well as some other sub-dialects.

Classification
Cahuilla is found in the Uto-Aztecan language family where it is denoted alongside Cupeño to be a Cupan language within the larger Californian language subgroup where it joins Serrano, Kitanemuk, Luiseño and Tongva (Gabrielino). This Californian subgroup consisting of Cupan and Serran languages was once titled the Takic group which has fallen out of use.

Exonyms and endonyms
One of the indigenous designations for the language is Ɂívil̃uɂat, alongside ʼÍvilluʼat, where Cahuilla could call themselves Ɂívil̃uqalet (s)/Ɂívil̃uwenetem (pl.), 'speaker(s) of ɂívil̃uɂat.' Other variations include Ivilyuat and Ivia. However, both the language and the people are oftentimes called 'Cahuilla.'

Phonology
Cahuilla has the following vowel and consonant phonemes (Bright 1965, Saubel and Munro 1980:1-6, Seiler and Hioki 1979: 8-9):

Consonants

Consonants in parentheses only occur in loans.

Vowels

Lengthened version of both result in their opened variant occurring.
 Both long  and short  only appear in borrowings.

Voiceless vowels
Word-finally, voiceless vowels occur as -Vh (a vowel followed by ).

  =  'owl'
  =  'ceremonial chief'
  =  'the day before yesterday'

  =  'my breast'
  =  'his nose'
  =  'my shoulder'

Phonotactics
Words in Ivilyuat may never start with a vowel, and consonant clusters generally indicate the break between morphemic units. Whereas  is treated as a regular consonant in word-initial locations, it occurs in consonant clusters via infixation or insertion and is not representative of a morphemic break.

Stress
There are three primary types of stress in Ivilyuat: primary, secondary and unstressed. Primary is distinguished from an unstressed syllable by loudness and elevation of pitch. Secondary stress carries less volume and the pitch is not as elevated as with primary stress. Generally, stress falls on the first syllable of the root, however there are numerous cases of doubt and ambiguity. The general pattern is: ... CV̀CVCV́CVCV̀CVCV̀ ..., where regular alternation occurs after the primary stress and secondary stress is added to the first syllable if followed by an additional -CV- group without stress. Long vowels function also as a distinct -CV- unit and take stress with the following syllable unit also taking stress: ... CV́VCV̀ ... This process can be seen here:
 CV́VCCV̀CVC : [qáankìčem] 'palo verde,' plur.
 CV́CVCV̀CVC : [tákalìčem] 'one-eyed ones'

Grammar
Ivilyuat is an agglutinative language. It uses various affixes, alternating between prefixes and suffixes, to change the meaning and grammatical function of words. As well, Ivilyuat leans heavily on descriptive properties in the construction of nouns, turning predicates into nouns.

Morphology
Ivilyuat consists of rich morphological phenomena, especially through its descriptive properties. For example, the word 'arrow,' or húyal, is derived from 'it is straightened' (húya) which has been transformed into 'that which is straightened' or 'the straightened one' (húya + -l), where the verb stem 'to straighten' is immediately recognizable. This phenomenon permeates the language such that some words are examples of a double derivation, such as 'blue/green' (túkvašnekiš). The word for the colour, túkvašnekiš, is derived from 'that which comes from heaven' which in turn comes from 'the thing where carrying [of the sun?] takes place,' where túkvaš means 'sky' and -nek is from nek-en ('to carry' with -en being the realized suffix).

Nouns and noun phrases
Some, but not all, nouns occur in two different states: absolutive and construct. Outside of these two states fall certain other nouns that both refuse to take a P1 (see below) nor a construct state form such as ɂáwal ('dog') and almost all additional animal terms which cannot be directly possessed; however, there is indication that some of these nouns show historical ties to both states, and issues present with either state usage tend to be semantic.

Distinguishing a noun from a verb can sometimes be difficult in Ivilyuat, however, whereas both verbs and nouns can take P1 prefixes, only nouns can take P2 ones.

Absolutive and construct states
Absolutive, also known as non-possessed nouns (NPN), and construct states help in the classification of nouns. For nouns that take either state, the process can either exhibit itself where the noun takes one form, both forms or even more productive derivations. For example, the word for (its) flower/blossom can be: séɂiš ('the flower' or 'the blossom'), séɂi ('its blossom'), séɂiški ('its flower') where séɂ- means to blossom and iš is the relativizing and absolutive suffix. Thus, séɂiš means 'blossom/flower' or, more literally, 'having completed the act of blossoming.'

The absolutive state occurs when a relational expression is transformed into an absolute expression, or when a predicate becomes an argument that can then be assigned to a particular place in a predicate. This state is constructed using the absolutive suffix, being one of four consonants (-t, -š, -l, -l̃). The suffix often is found in amalgamation with the preceding vowel, mostly -a or -i; however the case may be that there are more complex underlying functions than just that of the absolutive suffix.

The construct state is marked with P1 relational constructions and translates very roughly to possession.

 né-puš : 'my eye'
 né-ɂaš : 'my pet'
  né-téviŋiki : 'my little basket'

 
 púč-il̃ : 'the eye, seed(s)'
 ɂáč-il̃ : 'the pet'
  téviŋi-l̃ : 'the little basket'

 ne-téviŋi-l̃-ki : 'my little basket'

Inflection

Prefixes
Inflection in Ivilyuat is realized through both prefixation and suffixation, where prefixes mark the distinction of persons and suffixes mark plurality and case. Both O and P2 may co-occur, which sees O precede P2; P2 may precede P1. Never can all three prefixes occur simultaneously. O, for example, cannot combine with P1 within nouns (it can within verbs); P2 can only occur in nouns.

 he- is only found alongside monosyllabic noun stems.
 -y only occurs if an O prefix precedes it.

Suffixes
Number is marked with the suffixes -m, -em, -im and -am (táxliswetem 'the Indigenous people'), making a simple singular/plural distinction. Some nouns are not pluralizable, such as kʷíñil̃ 'acorn(s)' or méñikiš 'mesquite bean(s).'

The object is marked with the oblique case suffix -i, -y and -iy which sometimes includes glottalization either through insertion or infixation:

 táxliswet : 'the Indigenous person' (sing. subject)
 táxlisweɂt-i : 'id.' (sing. object)

 táxliswet-em : 'the Indigenous people' (plur. subject)
 táxliswet-m-i : 'id.' (plur. object)

The other cases are the: locative -ŋa, lative -(i)ka and abl -ax, marking roughly location/placement, direction/towards and point of departure, respectively. The lative case appears to combine only with construct state nouns only:
 kú-t : 'fire' (-ku- + )
 kú-t-ŋa / kú-ŋa : 'in the fire'
 kú-yka / *kút-ika : 'into the fire'

Case and plural endings can combine with one another, especially the locative and ablative:
 táxliswet-m-i : 'the Indigenous people'
 téma-l-ŋa-x / téma-ŋa-x : 'from the earth'

Pronouns
Pronouns in Ivilyuat can be broken down into three categories: personal, question/answer – indefinite and non-personal – non-question/answer – non-indefinite.

Nominalizers
Nominalization, or the creation of nouns from verbs and adverbs as is the case in Ivilyuat, occurs fairly frequently.

Verbial nominalizers
Seiler lists ten nominalizers attached to the verb playing a wide range of functions.

-ka(t) 'inceptive' 
Using Seiler's terminology, this nominalizer indicates an oriented relationship in the noun/action, very similar to the nominal suffix '-ka(t)' (see below). As tense plays little role in the language, this should not be taken to mean 'future.'

SUFF:suffix
PRON:pronoun
STEM:stem
P2:P2 prefix
P1:P1 prefix
O:object prefix

-(a)k(t) 'excellence' 
This denotes goodness or excellence.

-nax(t) 'supposed to fulfill function'
This denotes where one is supposed to fulfill a specialized function, notably in a socio-cultural context.

-(i)š 'completed action or process'
Denotes a completed action or being completed as a process.

 -vaš 'performing in a special situation'
Denotes performing an act in a specially defined situation. Compare the following examples:

-wet/-et 'habitual or competent performer'
Functioning similarly to '-vaš,' denotes a competent or habitual performer. When in combination with the durative ('-qal'/'-wen') or stative ('-wen'), it takes the form '-et.' Compare the following examples:

-ɂa & -at/-(ɂ)il̃ 'abstract nominalizers'
These makes abstract verbs into nouns. Where '-at' and '-il̃'/'-ɂil̃' can attach to abstract verbs with few restrictions, '-ɂa' is restricted to abstract verbs which are then possessed once nominalized.

-piš 'unrealized subordination'
Nominalizes verbs that both indicates subordination and something that has not yet happened.

-vel/-ve 'event already occurring or occurred'
Nominalizes verbs in regard to occurrence of the action.

-vaɂal 'located event'
A complex of suffixes where the verbal suffix '-vaɂ' indicates 'locale, place' such as:

Combining with '-al,' the abstract nominalizer, there become forms such as:

Adverbial nominalizers
There is only one adverbial nominalizer according to Seiler's Grammar, which is '-viš.' It can either affix to adverbs to denote being from a place or time or denote ordering.

 Place/Time

 Place/Time

 Ordering

Declension
There are three major forms of declension in Ivilyuat: oriented relationship, diminutive (DIM) and special marking.

The suffix '-ka(t)' indicated an oriented relationship which is used most notably in kinship terms, '-mal'/'-mal̃'/'-ma' marks the diminutive and '-(V)k(t)' indicates someone or something that is marked in a special or notable way.

 Oriented Relationship

 Diminutive

 Special Marking

Verbs and verb phrases
Ivilyuat verbs show agreement with both their subject and object. Person agreement, of which there are three, is shown by prefixes and number agreement, of which there are two, is shown by suffixes. Additionally, verbs take both inflectional and derivational affixes, where derivational are formed in the root. As such, an inflectional affix can follow a derivational affix, but a derivational affix can never follow an inflectional one. To be classed as a verb, the word must include both a subject prefix and at least one non-personal inflectional affix; transitive verbs must include also an object prefix.

Within verbs of the Desert dialect, tense plays almost no role, expressing past on nouns and noun phrases with the suffix -ɂa. Kinship terms, though, are excluded and use a form roughly translated to be 'past existence of kinsperson.' However, while tense plays little role within the verb phrase, aspect and mode are present throughout.

Aspect
Status  (actuality of event)
+ Realized
– Realized
Possible (mode)
Expected (mode)
Desired (mode)
Perspective
+ Absolute
– Absolute

Inflection
Every verb must take both -2 (subject) and at least on inflectional affix from -1 or +1 alongside the necessary stem. -1 and +1 are incompatible as is -4 and -1, as -4 only occurs in combination with +1's -nem.

Derivation
Derivation within the verb phrase takes on a variety of characteristics. Derivational affixes can be classified into one of two categories: endocentric and exocentric, where endocentrically deriving affixes occur about twice as often as exocentric ones. The difference is established upon the change in distribution class which can take the form of a derivation of a verbal stem from a nominal basis or a transitive stem from an intransitive one.

Syntax
Although Ivilyuat employs a relatively free word order, its underlying classification is that of a subject–object–verb (or SOV) language. Its verbs show heavy agreement, indicating the subject and object even when not overtly present, and the subject and object may appear after the verb, highlighting specific usage.

Classifiers
Ivilyuat contains about a dozen or so classifiers notably indicating the type of noun being modified or possessed. Classifiers cover nouns ranging from general, inanimate items -ɂa in ne-m-éxam-ɂa 'it (is) my thing' lit., 'it (is) somehow doing this way,' to trees, plants, fruits, meats, animals and moieties.

General
 -ɂa

Trees, plants and their fruits
 kíɂiwɂa
 ɂáyɂa
 číɂa
 wésɂa
 séxɂa

Kinds of meats
 waɂ / wáwa
 čáxni
 téneq

Animals
 ɂaš

Moieties
 kíl̃iw

For all non-animate nouns, the general classifier -ɂa is used, otherwise classifiers distinguish the nouns themselves. For trees, plants and their fruits, there are five classifiers. kíɂiwɂa is used for trees and certain plants/fruits found in a naturally occurring group, and this is used to help denote legal claims as members of certain lineages had grouping-specific sites of harvest. The word derives from the verb stem 'to wait' as visible: pe-n-kíɂiw-qal 'I am waiting for it' ... ne-kíɂiw-ɂa 'It (is) my waiting' i.e., 'It is the thing that I am waiting for' or 'It is my claim.' Generally, pinyons, mesquites and oaks factor into this usage. ɂáyɂa is used for fresh fruit and blossoms picked from trees and stems from the verb 'to pluck' or 'to pick' (pe-n-ɂáy-ɂa 'I am plucking or picking it' ... ne-ɂáy-ɂa 'It (is) my plucking or picking'). Individual beans or acorns are not compatible with this classifier. číɂa is used to describe picking up edible items after they have fallen to the ground such as mesquite beans, acorns, black beans and possibly corn. wésɂa applies to plants and their fruits which have been planted (in a row) by individuals. Plants such as corn, watermelon, cacti, wheat and palm trees fall under this classifier. Finally, séxɂa indicates food items that are being or have been cooked such as black beans, corn or jerked meat.

Other classifiers include kinds of meat, animals and moieties. Meat breaks down into waɂ/wáwa, čáxni and téneq (roasted, melted and barbecued, respectively). The most important classifier for animals is the relation to animals as pets, expressed with ɂaš, which includes horses (pásukat), cottontail rabbits (távut), turtles (ɂáyil̃), coyotes (ɂísil̃), bears (húnwet), snakes (séwet), fish (kíyul) and eagles (ɂáswet) amongst others; however, this does not include wild cat (túkut). Finally, ɂívil̃uwenetem were broken down into two moieties: ɂísil̃ (coyote) and túkut (wildcat) where individuals needed to marry outside of their moiety, i.e. a Wildcat man must marry a Coyote woman and vice versa. This was expressed using kíl̃iw (ne-kíl̃iw 'my partner' or túkut/ɂísil̃ ne-kíl̃iw 'my partner, the wildcat/coyote').

Demonstratives
Ivilyuat uses a single demonstrative ɂi(ɂ) ("this/that") that takes the form ɂi before sonorants and ɂiɂ elsewhere.

It can be modified with deictic markers meaning local or distant/remote.

The complex and simple forms have no difference in perceived meaning according to Seiler. The inflection agrees with the sentence itself where the deictic marker co-ordinates with the subject or verb such as in "ɂiɂ peɂ menil̃" meaning "this over there, the moon," as peɂ is inflected to mark the singular subject menil̃. Additionally, there are clitic forms of this marker: pe, pee and pey.

Vocabulary

Word origins
A vast majority of Ivilyuat words come from Uto-Aztecan roots and there is a large shared vocabulary between neighbouring languages such as Luiseño or Serrano. Due to language contact, however, many Spanish words have been adopted into the language, such as máys ('corn') or ɂavugáaduɂ ('lawyer') from Spanish maíz and abogado, respectively. Conversely, Ivilyuat has taken little to no English loan words.

Kinship terms
Ivilyuat can either express kinship terms relationally or through an establishing expression.

 Relational

 Establishing

Numerals
Ivilyuat uses a base-ten system with unique words for 'five' and 'ten.'

Basic sample vocabulary and language comparison

Place names
Few place names within Cahuilla remained the same over the years with English or Spanish names taking over. Here are several examples:
 Káviñiš, Qàwal hémaɂ and Pàl síwiš – Indian Wells
 Séx – Palm Springs
 Kíš čáwal – White Water
 Pàl téwet – Indio
 Wìyal Ɂámuyka – Torres Peak
 Yamesével – Mission Creek
 Qáwiš húlawet (Mtn: Qáwiš yúlawet) – near La Quinta

Writing systems
Cahuilla has been and, to an extent, still is an unwritten language. Between IPA and NAPA, there are ways to write the language down, but there is no agreed-upon script used Nationwide. That being said, the most employed orthography is that of a modified NAPA found in Seiler and Hioki's "Cahuilla Dictionary". The alphabet has 35 letters with an accent (either  or ) over vowels denoting stress patterns. Words that begin in a vowel can be written without the glottal stop, but the sound is still present.

IPA notation

Use and revitalization efforts 

Alvin Siva of the Los Coyotes Band of Cahuilla and Cupeño Indians, a fluent speaker, died on June 26, 2009. He preserved the tribe's traditional bird songs, sung in the Cahuilla language, by teaching them to younger generations of Cahuilla people. Katherine Siva Saubel (b. 1920 - d. 2011) was a native Cahuilla speaker dedicated to preserving the language.

In April 2014, the University of California, Riverside offered free public workshops in the Cahuilla language, later making a full four-class course in the language available to undergraduates and members of the Cahuilla tribal community beginning in the fall of 2020.

See also

Cahuilla mythology
Cahuilla traditional narratives

References

 Saubel, Katherine Siva, Pamela Munro, Chem'ivillu' (Let's Speak Cahuilla), Los Angeles, American Indian Studies Center, University of California, 1982.
Seiler, Hansjakob, Cahuilla Texts with an Introduction, Bloomington, Language Science Monographs, Indiana University Press, 1970.
Seiler, Hansjakob, Cahuilla Grammar, Banning, Malki Museum Press, 1977.
 Seiler, Hansjakob, Kojiro Hioki, Cahuilla Dictionary, Banning, Malki Museum press, 1979.

External links
The Limu Project active language revitalization
Resources in and about the Cahuilla language
Cahuilla pronunciation guide
Cahuilla grammar, available through the Long Now Foundation
Cahuilla language overview at the Survey of California and Other Indian Languages
OLAC resources in and about the Cahuilla language
Cahuilla basic lexicon at the Global Lexicostatistical Database

Cahuilla
Takic
Takic languages
Native American language revitalization
Endangered Uto-Aztecan languages